The 1947 North Dakota State Bison football team was an American football team that North Dakota Agricultural College (now known as North Dakota State University) in the North Central Conference (NCC) during the 1947 college football season.  In its third season under head coach Stan Kostka, the team compiled a 1–7 record (0–5 against NCC opponents) and finished last in the NCC. The team played its home games at Dacotah Field in Fargo, North Dakota.

Schedule

References

North Dakota Agricultural
North Dakota State Bison football seasons
North Dakota Agricultural Bison football